In the waters in and around New Zealand, 77 living species of crabs (and 10 species of crab-like Anomura) have been recorded, along with a further 24 species of fossil crabs (marked with an obelisk). Of the extant crabs, 37 are endemic to New Zealand (marked in boldface). The taxonomy below follows Ng et al. (2008) for the extant species, and De Grave et al. (2009) for the fossils.

Almost all the species are marine, with a single freshwater species, Amarinus lacustris (Hymenosomatidae). An updated checklist published in 2010 lists 167 species of Brachyura, plus a little over 50 species of crab-like Anomura. This list (of N.Z. Decapoda) has been republished with annotations in 2011.

Brachyura

Section Dromiacea
Dromiidae
Petalomera wilsoni (Fulton & Grant, 1902)
Homolidae
Dagnaudus petterdi (Grant, 1905)
Homola orientalis Henderson, 1888
Yaldwynopsis spinimanus (Griffin, 1965) 
Latreilliidae
Eplumula australiensis (Henderson, 1888)

Section Raninoida
Raninidae
Hemioon novozelandicum Glaessner, 1980 †
Laeviranina perarmata Glaessner, 1960 †
Lyreidus elegans Glaessner, 1960 †
Lyreidus tridentatus De Haan 1841
Lyreidus waitakiensis Glaessner, 1980 †
Ranilia pororariensis Glaessner, 1980 †

Section Cyclodorippoida
Cymonomidae
Cymonomus aequilonius Dell, 1971
''Cymonomus bathamae Dell, 1971Torynommidae
Torynomma flemingi Glaessner, 1980 †

Section Heterotremata

LeucosiidaeEbalia laevis (Bell, 1855)Merocryptus lambriformis A. Milne-Edwards, 1873
Tanaoa pustulosus (Wood-Mason in Wood-Mason & Alcock, 1891)
MajidaeEurynolambrus australis H. Milne-Edwards & Lucas, 1841Eurynome bituberculata Griffin, 1964Jacquinotia edwardsi (Jacquinot, 1853)Leptomithrax atavus Glaessner, 1960 †Leptomithrax australis (Jacquinot in Jacquinot & Lucas, 1853)Leptomithrax garricki Griffin, 1966Leptomithrax irirangi Glaessner, 1960 †Leptomithrax longimanus Miers, 1876Leptomithrax longipes (Thomson, 1902)
Leptomithrax tuberculatus Whitelegge, 1900
Leptomithrax uruti Glaessner, 1960 †
Notomithrax minor (Filhol, 1885)Notomithrax peronii (H. Milne-Edwards, 1834)Notomithrax ursus (Herbst, 1788)Prismatopus filholi (A. Milne-Edwards, 1876)Teratomaia richardsoni (Dell, 1960)Inachidae
Achaeus curvirostris (A. Milne-Edwards, 1873)
Cyrtomaia lamellata Rathbun, 1906
Dorhynchus ramusculus (Baker, 1906)
Platymaia maoria Dell, 1963
Platymaia n.spTrichoplatus huttoni A. Milne-Edwards, 1876Inachoididae
Pyromaia tuberculata (Lockington, 1877)
Epialtidae
Actinotocarcinus chidgeyi Jenkins, 1974 †
Rochinia riversandersoni (Alcock, 1895)
Leptomaia tuberculata Griffin & Tranter, 1986
AtelecyclidaePteropeltarion novaezelandiae Dell, 1972Trichopeltarion fantasticum Richardson & Dell, 1964Trichopeltarion greggi Dell, 1969 †
CancridaeMetacarcinus novaezelandiae (Hombron & Jacquinot, 1846)Tumidocarcinidae
Tumidocarcinus dentatus Glaessner, 1960 †
Tumidocarcinus giganteus Glaessner, 1960 †
Tumidocarcinus tumidus (Woodward, 1876) †
Dorippidae
?Eodorippe spedeni Glaessner, 1980 †
Macropipidae
Pororaria eocenica Glaessner, 1980 †
Portunidae
Ovalipes catharus (White in White & Doubleday, 1843)
Ovalipes molleri (Ward, 1933)
Ovalipes sp A. Glaessner, 1960 †
Portunus pelagicus (Linnaeus, 1766)
Liocarcinus corrugatus (Pennant, 1777)Nectocarcinus antarcticus (Hombron & Jacquinot, 1846)Nectocarcinus bennetti Takeda & Miyake, 1969Rhachiosoma granulifera (Glaessrier, 1960) †
Scylla serrata (Forskal, 1775)
Menippidae
Menippe sp.  Glaessner, 1960 †
Pseudocarcinus sp. Glaessner, 1960 †
Oziidae
Ozius truncatus H. Milne-Edwards, 1834
Pilumnidae
Pilumnopeus serratifrons (Kinahan, 1856)Pilumnus lumpinus Bennett, 1964Pilumnus novaezelandiae Filhol, 1886BelliidaeHeterozius rotundifrons A. Milne-Edwards 1867Goneplacidae
Carcinoplax victoriensis Rathbun, 1923
Goneplax arenicola (Glaessner, 1960) †Neommatocarcinus huttoni (Filhol, 1886)Galenidae
Galene proavita Glaessner, 1960 †

Section Thoracotremata

GrapsidaeAustrohelice crassa (Dana, 1851)Leptograpsus variegatus (Fabricius, 1793)
Miograpsus papaka Fleming, 1981 †
Planes cyaneus Dana, 1852
Planes marinus Rathbun, 1914
Plagusiidae
Plagusia chabrus (Linnaeus, 1758)
Plagusia squamosa (Herbst, 1790)
Varunidae
Hemigrapsus crenulatus (H. Milne-Edwards, 1837)Hemigrapsus sexdentatus (H. Milne-Edwards, 1837)Cyclograpsus insularum Campbell & Griffin, 1966
Cyclograpsus lavauxi H. Milne-Edwards, 1853
PinnotheridaePinnotheres atrinicola Page, 1983Pinnotheres novaezelandiae Filhol, 1886OcypodidaeMacrophthalmus hirtipes (Jacquinot in Hombron & Jacquinot, 1846)?Macrophthalmus major (Glaessner, 1960) †
Hymenosomatidae
Amarinus lacustris (Chilton, 1882)Elamena longirostris Filhol, 1885Elamena momona Melrose, 1975Elamena producta Kirk, 1878Halicarcinus cookii (Filhol, 1885)Halicarcinus innominatus Richardson, 1949
Halicarcinus ovatus Stimpson, 1858
Halicarcinus planatus (Fabricius, 1775)Halicarcinus tongi Melrose, 1975Halicarcinus varius (Dana, 1851)Halicarcinus whitei (Miers, 1876)Halimena aotearoa Melrose, 1975Hymenosoma depressum Jacquinot, 1853Neohymenicus pubescens (Dana, 1851)Anomura

Lithodidae
Lithodes aotearoa Ahyong, 2010
Lithodes jessica Ahyong, 2010
Lithodes macquaria Ahyong, 2010
Lithodes robertsoni Ahyong, 2010
Neolithodes brodiei Dawson & Yaldwyn, 1970
Neolithodes bronwynae Ahyong, 2010
Paralomis dawsoni Macpherson, 2001
Paralomis debodeorum Feldman, 1998 †
Paralomis echidna Ahyong, 2010
Paralomis hirtella Saint Laurent & Macpherson, 1997
Paralomis poorei Ahyong, 2010
Paralomis staplesi Ahyong, 2010
Paralomis webberi Ahyong, 2010
Paralomis zealandica Dawson & Yaldwyn, 1971
PaguridaePorcellanopagurus edwardsi Filhol, 1885Porcellanidae
Petrolisthes elongatus (H. Milne-Edwards, 1837)Petrolisthes novaezelandiae Flihol, 1886Petrocheles spinosus'' Miers, 1876

See also 

 Fauna of New Zealand

References

Crustaceans of New Zealand
 List, New Zealand
New Zealand